Philippe Houillon (born December 15, 1951) was a member of the National Assembly of France
from 1993 to 2017.  He represented the first constituency of the Val-d'Oise department. He is a member of The Republicans.

Biography
After having studied in the institutions of Notre-Dame d'Enghien and Notre-Dame de Bury in Margency, he pursued law studies at Paris-Assas.

He was a Lawyer at age 21, then president of the Bar Association of the Val d'Oise, he is appointed judge of the Court of Justice of the Republic (from June 25, 1997).

He was a member of the Union for French Democracy group from 1993 to 1996, then, in 1997, changed to Liberal Democracy, joined the Union for a Popular Movement in 2002, then the Republicans in 2015.

References

1951 births
Living people
Union for a Popular Movement politicians
Deputies of the 12th National Assembly of the French Fifth Republic
Deputies of the 13th National Assembly of the French Fifth Republic
Deputies of the 14th National Assembly of the French Fifth Republic
Members of Parliament for Val-d'Oise